Amir Dan Aczel (November 6, 1950 – November 26, 2015) was an Israeli-born American lecturer in mathematics and the history of mathematics and science, and an author of popular books on mathematics and science.

Biography 
Amir D. Aczel was born in Haifa, Israel. Aczel's father was the captain of a passenger ship that sailed primarily in the Mediterranean Sea. When he was ten, Aczel's father taught his son how to steer a ship and navigate. This inspired Aczel's book The Riddle of the Compass. Amir graduated from the Hebrew Reali School in Haifa, in 1969.

When Aczel was 21, he studied at the University of California, Berkeley. He graduated with a BA in mathematics in 1975, and received a Master of Science in 1976. Several years later Aczel earned a Ph.D. in statistics from the University of Oregon.

Aczel taught mathematics at universities in California, Alaska, Massachusetts, Italy, and Greece. He married his wife Debra in 1984 and had one daughter, Miriam, and one stepdaughter. He accepted a professorship at Bentley College in Massachusetts, where he taught classes on statistics and the history of science and history of mathematics. He authored two textbooks on statistics. While teaching at Bentley, Aczel wrote several non-technical books on mathematics and science, as well as two textbooks. His book, Fermat's Last Theorem, was a United States bestseller and was nominated for a Los Angeles Times Book Prize. Aczel appeared on CNN, CNBC, The History Channel, and Nightline. Aczel was a 2004 Fellow of the John Simon Guggenheim Memorial Foundation, a visiting scholar in the History of Science at Harvard University (2007), and was awarded a Sloan Foundation grant to research his 2015 book Finding Zero. In 2003, he became a research fellow at the Boston University Center for Philosophy and History of Science, and in Fall 2011 was teaching mathematics courses at University of Massachusetts Boston. He was a speaker at La Ciudad de las Ideas (The City of Ideas), Puebla, Mexico, in 2008 , 2010 , and 2011. He died in Nîmes, France in 2015 from cancer.

Works 
Complete Business Statistics, 8th Edition, 2012.  
Statistics: Concepts and Applications, 1995. 
How to Beat the I.R.S. at Its Own Game: Strategies to Avoid and Fight an Audit, 1996. 
 Fermat's Last Theorem: Unlocking the Secret of an Ancient Mathematical Problem, 1997. 
 God's Equation: Einstein, Relativity, and the Expanding Universe, 1999. 
 The Mystery of the Aleph: Mathematics, the Kabbalah, and the Search for Infinity, 2000. 
 Probability 1: The Book That Proves There Is Life In Outer Space, Harvest Books, January 2000. .
 The Riddle of the Compass: The Invention that Changed the World, 2001. 
 Entanglement: The Greatest Mystery in Physics, 2002.  and 
 Pendulum: Léon Foucault and the Triumph of Science, 2003. 
 Chance: A Guide to Gambling, Love, and the Stock Market, 2004. 
 Descartes' Secret Notebook: A True Tale of Mathematics, Mysticism, and the Quest to Understand the Universe, 2005. 
 The Artist and the Mathematician: The Story of Nicolas Bourbaki, the Genius Mathematician Who Never Existed, 2007. High Stakes Publishing, London. .
 The Jesuit and the Skull: Teilhard de Chardin, Evolution, and the Search for Peking Man, 2007. 
 Uranium Wars: The Scientific Rivalry that Created the Nuclear Age, 2009. 
 The Cave and the Cathedral: How a Real-Life Indiana Jones and a Renegade Scholar Decoded the Ancient Art of Man, 2009. 
 Present at the Creation: The Story of CERN and the Large Hadron Collider, 2010.  
 A Strange Wilderness: The Lives of the Great Mathematicians, 2011. 
 Why Science Does Not Disprove God, 2014. 
 Finding Zero, 2015.

References

External links
 
 
 

1950 births
2015 deaths
20th-century American mathematicians
21st-century American mathematicians
Hebrew Reali School alumni
Bentley University faculty
Boston University faculty
Deaths from cancer in France
Harvard University staff
American historians of mathematics
Israeli emigrants to the United States
Israeli Jews
Writers from Haifa
UC Berkeley College of Letters and Science alumni
University of Massachusetts Boston faculty
University of Oregon alumni